Glyphipterix magnatella is a species of sedge moth in the genus Glyphipterix. It was described by Nikolay Grigoryevich Erschoff in 1877. It is found in Siberia, Russia.

References

Moths described in 1877
Glyphipterigidae
Moths of Asia